Peter Cleere (born 1983) is an Irish hurler who played as a right corner-forward for the Kilkenny senior team.

Cleere made his first appearance for the team during the 2004 Walsh Cup and became a regular member of the team and panel over the following four seasons. During that time he won two All-Ireland winners' medals and two Leinster winners' medals as a non-playing substitute.

At club level Cleere plays with the Blacks and Whites club.

He was elected Cathaoirleach (Chairman) of Kilkenny County Council from 2019 to 2020.

References

1983 births
Living people
Blacks and Whites hurlers
Kilkenny inter-county hurlers